In enzymology, a pyridoxamine-phosphate transaminase is an enzyme that catalyzes the chemical reaction

pyridoxamine 5'-phosphate + 2-oxoglutarate  pyridoxal 5'-phosphate + D-glutamate

Thus, the two substrates of this enzyme are pyridoxamine 5'-phosphate and 2-oxoglutarate, whereas its two products are pyridoxal 5'-phosphate and D-glutamate.

This enzyme belongs to the family of transferases, specifically the transaminases, which transfer nitrogenous groups.  The systematic name of this enzyme class is pyridoxamine-5'-phosphate:2-oxoglutarate aminotransferase (D-glutamate-forming). Other names in common use include pyridoxamine phosphate aminotransferase, pyridoxamine 5'-phosphate-alpha-ketoglutarate transaminase, and pyridoxamine 5'-phosphate transaminase.  This enzyme participates in vitamin B6 metabolism.

References

 

EC 2.6.1
Enzymes of unknown structure